Lewisham Police Station is a police station in Lewisham High Street in the London Borough of Lewisham.

History 
The station was built to replace the nearby Ladywell Police Station and was one of four stations procured under a private finance initiative (PFI) between the Metropolitan Police Authority and Equion (part of the John Laing Group). The contract was signed in October 2001, and was valued at £120 million, of which Lewisham accounted for approximately £30 million.

Construction began on 26 November 2001, on the site of the old Army & Navy Store on Lewisham High Street, and the new building was topped-out on 17 July 2002. It was official opened by Sir John Stevens, Commissioner of the Metropolitan Police, on 16 April 2004.

Facilities 
The station is the largest purpose-built police station in Europe, and contains the largest custody suite in the Metropolitan Police, as well as stables for 36 police horses and a multi-storey car park.

References

External links 

Police stations in London
Buildings and structures in the London Borough of Lewisham